The Focke-Wulf Fw 47 Höhengeier (German: "Vulture"), known internally to Focke-Wulf as the A 47, was a meteorological aircraft developed in Germany in 1931. It was a parasol-wing monoplane of largely conventional design, unusual only in the expansiveness of its wing area. Tested first by the Reichsverband der Deutschen Luftfahrtindustrie, and then the weather station at Hamburg, the type was ordered into production to equip ten major weather stations around Germany.

Variants
 A 47a - prototype with Argus As 10 engine
 Fw 47C - production version with Argus As 10C engine
 Fw 47D - production version with Argus As 10D engine
 Fw 47E - production version with Argus As 10E engine

Specifications (Fw 47C)

References
 
 
 

1930s German civil utility aircraft
Fw 047
Single-engined tractor aircraft
Parasol-wing aircraft
Meteorological instrumentation and equipment
Aircraft first flown in 1931